This is a list of airports in New Zealand, sorted by location.

List 
Airport names shown in bold indicate the airport has scheduled passenger service on commercial airlines. The cities shown in bold are international.

See also 
 Transport in New Zealand
 List of busiest airports in New Zealand
 List of airports by ICAO code: N#NZ - New Zealand
 List of former Royal New Zealand Air Force stations

References 
 Great Circle Mapper - ICAO and IATA codes

External links

 AIP New Zealand - airport and heliport charts

 
 

 
New Zealand
Airports in New Zealand
Airports
New Zealand